Club Deportivo Rota is a Spanish football team based in Rota, Cádiz, in the autonomous community of Andalusia. Founded in 1976, it currently plays in Tercera División RFEF – Group 10, holding home matches at Estadio Municipal Alcalde Navarro Flores, with a capacity of 5,000 spectators.

Season to season

24 seasons in Tercera División
1 season in Tercera División RFEF

References

External links
 
Soccerway team profile

1952 establishments in Spain
Association football clubs established in 1952
Football clubs in Andalusia